Adalbert Deșu (24 March 1909 – 6 June 1937) was a Romanian football striker. He was a member of Romania national football team which competed at the 1930 FIFA World Cup in Uruguay. Deșu was also the first scorer for Romania at a FIFA World Cup. He scored a goal in the first minute of his team's first group game of the first football world cup.

Career

Deșu, of Hungarian origin, was born in Gátalja (Gătaia) and started his football career in his hometown. After a while he moved to Reşiţa, playing for two years at UDR. In 1929, he was called up to the Romania national football team for the first time, scoring in a friendly against Bulgaria. He was also picked up for the Romanian team which competed in 1930 FIFA World Cup. The chairman of the club where he played, Wolfgang Auschnit, refused to pay him the salary in the period of the World Cup. After the World Cup, Deșu eventually left the club because of the chairman. Deșu scored Romania's first goal against Peru, and played his last match for the national team in the second match of that World Cup for Romania, against Uruguay. After the World Cup, he signed with Banatul Timișoara, but in 1933 he retired from football because of pneumonia. In 1937, he died of pneumonia, aged 28.

International goals
Romania's goal tally first

References and notes

External links

1909 births
1937 deaths
People from Gătaia
People from the Kingdom of Hungary
Romanian sportspeople of Hungarian descent
Romanian footballers
Romania international footballers
CSM Reșița players
Banatul Timișoara players
1930 FIFA World Cup players
Association football forwards
Deaths from pneumonia in Romania